François Vidal (14 July 1832 – 25 May 1911) was a French Provençal poet and activist.

Early life
François Vidal was born on 14 July 1832.

Career
François Vidal was one of the first Provençal activists to join the Félibrige. He had a deep knowledge of the Occitan language, and was the editor (pagesetting and revision) of Frédéric Mistral's Tresor dóu Felibrige.

He was the curator of the Bibliothèque Méjanes, the public library in Aix-en-Provence.

Vidal wrote poetry in Provençal. He revived the traditional use of the Provençal instrument known as "tambourin." In 1876, he became a "Majoral" (council member) of the Félibrige, a cultural and literary movement for the promotion of Provençal heritage.

Death
Vidal died on 25 May 1911. He was buried at the Saint-Pierre Cemetery.

References

External links

1832 births
1911 deaths
Writers from Aix-en-Provence
French poets
Occitan poets
Provençal-language Occitan writers